The Raukokore River is a river in the northeast of New Zealand's North Island. it flows north from the slopes of Mount Hikurangi, reaching the sea at Papatea Bay close to the small settlement of Raukokore.

Rivers of the Gisborne District
Rivers of New Zealand